Pasi Schwalger (born 16 October 1982) is a Samoan Australian former football and Australian rules football player. has represented Samoa internationally in soccer.

Career
Schwalger was born in Mulinu'u, but played in Australia for most of his career. He initially played as a goalkeeper for the Preston Lions. In 2004 he traveled to England for trials with Southend United, but was not selected after Southend hired a pair of goalkeepers. He left the Preston Lions in the following off-season, moving to the Green Gully Cavaliers.

In May 2004 he was selected for the Samoa national team for the 2004 OFC Nations Cup and World Cup qualifiers. In 2007 he was selected for the team for the 2007 South Pacific Games in Apia. He was part of Samoa's 7–0 victory over American Samoa.

In 2008 he played with the Fawkner Blues. In 2009 he played for Werribee City FC, but traveled to Greece in April for a trial with an unnamed first-division club. In November 2009 he announced he was switching codes to Australian rules football, saying that he had had enough of soccer and "[did]n't have the drive and motivation to do it any more". After an initial approach by Bacchus Marsh Football Club coach David Callendar, he subsequently began training with suburban Melbourne club Heidelberg Football Club. On 20 March 2010, Schwalger suffered an ACL injury sidelining him for the year. He moved to Bacchus Marsh in 2011. In 2014, he played in an Essendon District Football League (EDFL) Premiership with Division 1 club, West Coburg.

References

External links
 
 

Living people
1982 births
People from Tuamasaga
Samoan people of German descent
Australian sportspeople of Samoan descent
Samoan footballers
Association football goalkeepers
Samoa international footballers
Preston Lions FC players
Heidelberg United FC players
Samoan expatriate footballers
Samoan expatriate sportspeople in Australia
Expatriate soccer players in Australia